Irula, also known as Iruliga, are a Dravidian ethnic group inhabiting the Indian states of Tamil Nadu, Kerala and Karnataka. A scheduled tribe, their population in this region is estimated at around 200,000 people. People of Irula ethnicity are called Irular, and speak Irula, which belongs to the Dravidian family.

Etymology 
Irular means "dark people" in Tamil and Malayalam, from the root word irul, meaning "darkness." Thurston speculated that it either referred to the darkness of the jungles which they inhabited or their dark skin complexion.

Distribution 
The tribe numbers around 200,000 spread across three states: 189,621 in Tamil Nadu, 23,721 in Kerala and 10,259 in Karnataka. Those in Karnataka are named Iruligas. The Irulas are mainly concentrated in northern Tamil Nadu: in a wedge extending from Krishnagiri and Dharmapuri districts in the west to Ariyalur and Cuddalore districts in the south and Tiruvallur district in the north. Small populations live in Coimbatore and Nilgiris districts and were classified by Thurston as a different population. In Kerala, the Irulas are in Palakkad district, while in Karnataka they are concentrated in Ramanagara and Bangalore districts.

Genetics 

A study by Yelmen et al (2019) found that the Irula were the closest likely proxy for the indigenous 'AASI', or Ancient Ancestral South Indian, one of the presumed founder and autochthonous original Indian populations. They showed a closer fit when modelled than alternatives that have been suggested such as the Onge or East Asians.
The DNA analysis (2018) of a skeleton from the Indus Valley Civilisation found in Rakhigarhi showed greater affinity with the Irula people than any other modern ethnic group in India.

Language 

The Irula speak the Irula language, a Dravidian language that is closely related to Tamil.

Economy 

Traditionally, the main occupation of the Irulas has been snake, rat catching and honey collection. They also work as labourers (coolies) in the fields of the landlords during the sowing and harvesting seasons or in the rice mills. Fishing and cattle farm is also a major occupation.

Rats destroy a quarter of the grain grown on Tamil Nadu-area farms annually. To combat this pest, Irula men use a traditional earthen pot fumigation method. Smoke is blown through their mouths, which leads to severe respiratory and heart problems.

In January 2017, Masi Sadaiyan and Vadivel Gopal from the Irula tribe of Tamil Nadu were brought in, along with two translators, to work with detection dogs to track down and capture invasive Burmese pythons in Key Largo, Florida. The Irula men and their translators were paid $70,000 by the State of Florida, and captured 14 pythons in less than two weeks.

Caste Discrimination
Irula people face severe discrimination and harassment from other castes and numerous such cases are reported every year. 

 In 2020, a girl named Dhanalaxmi was assaulted and barred from getting a Scheduled Tribe certificate by Vanniyar community in her village. 
 In Dharmapuri, Irula people were trashed and urinated upon by a mob who were infuriated by the marriage between a Irula man and a Vanniyar woman.

Police Atrocities 
Irula people have been continuously harassed and abused by Tamil Nadu State Police for decades. Some of the well-known and recently happened events are:  

 Athiyur Vijaya Rape (1993) 
 Thirukoyilur mass rape (2011)
 Abduction by Alangiyam Tripur Police Station (2021)
Four Fake theft cases foisted against 14-year-old Irula Boy in Virudhachalam Police Station (2022).

See also 
 Irula language
 Tondai Nadu
 Jai Bhim (film)

References

External links 

 

"Building a better Rat Trap: Technological Innovation, Human Capital and the Irular" - Economic Research Paper about the Irula
 "Irular: The Seekers of light" - Article by G. S. Unnikrishnan Nair in Kerala Calling March 2014

Tamil society
Social groups of India
Scheduled Tribes of Kerala
Scheduled Tribes of Tamil Nadu